Cercophora is a genus of fungi which was within the Lasiosphaeriaceae family. As of 2020, it was placed into the Neoschizotheciaceae family.

Species
As accepted by Species Fungorum;

Cercophora acanthigera 
Cercophora aggregata 
Cercophora albicollis 
Cercophora aligarhiensis 
Cercophora ambigua 
Cercophora anisura 
Cercophora appalachianensis 
Cercophora aquatica 
Cercophora argentina 
Cercophora brevifila 
Cercophora caerulea 
Cercophora cainii 
Cercophora californica 
Cercophora cephalothecoidea 
Cercophora citrina 
Cercophora coprogena 
Cercophora coronata 
Cercophora crustosa 
Cercophora dulciaquae 
Cercophora fici 
Cercophora flabelliformis 
Cercophora gossypina 
Cercophora himalayensis 
Cercophora hydrophila 
Cercophora ignis 
Cercophora indica 
Cercophora kalimpongensis 
Cercophora limneticum 
Cercophora macrocarpa 
Cercophora minuta 
Cercophora mirabilis 
Cercophora mutabilis 
Cercophora nainitalensis 
Cercophora natalitia 
Cercophora newfieldiana 
Cercophora ovalis 
Cercophora pakistani 
Cercophora palmicola 
Cercophora pilosa 
Cercophora recta 
Cercophora rostrata 
Cercophora rubrotuberculata 
Cercophora sarawacensis 
Cercophora scortea 
Cercophora septentrionalis 
Cercophora silvatica 
Cercophora similiscortea 
Cercophora solaris 
Cercophora sordarioides 
Cercophora sparsa 
Cercophora spinosa 
Cercophora spirillospora 
Cercophora squamulosa 
Cercophora sulphurella 
Cercophora thailandica 
Cercophora tuberculata 
Cercophora vinosa 

Former species;
 C. angulispora  = Triangularia angulispora, Podosporaceae
 C. arenicola  = Lasiosphaeris arenicola, Lasiosphaeridaceae
 C. areolata  = Areotheca areolata, Naviculisporaceae
 C. atropurpurea  = Pseudoschizothecium atropurpureum, Schizotheciaceae
 C. caudata  = Immersiella caudata, Neoschizotheciaceae
 C. citrinella  = Camptosphaeria citrinella, Sordariales
 C. conica  = Neoschizothecium conicum, Neoschizotheciaceae
 C. coprophila  = Cladorrhinum coprophilum, Podosporaceae
 C. costaricensis  = Podospora costaricensis, Podosporaceae
 C. elephantina  = Lasiosphaeria elephantina, Lasiosphaeriaceae
 C. grandiuscula  = Cladorrhinum grandiusculum, Podosporaceae
 C. heterospora  = Tripterosporella heterospora, Sordariales
 C. lanuginosa  = Lasiosphaeria lanuginosa, Lasiosphaeriaceae
 C. meynae  = Bovilla meynae, Lasiosphaeriaceae
 C. muskokensis  = Sporormiella muskokensis, Sporormiaceae
 C. pongamiae  = Bovilla pongamiae, Lasiosphaeriaceae
 C. rugulosa  = Lasiosphaeria rugulosa, Lasiosphaeriaceae
 C. samala  = Triangularia samala, Podosporaceae
 C. striata  = Triangularia striata, Podosporaceae
 C. sulphurea  = Camptosphaeria sulphurea, Sordariales
 C. terricola  = Cladorrhinum terricola, Podosporaceae

References

External links
Cercophora at Index Fungorum

Lasiosphaeriaceae
Taxa named by Karl Wilhelm Gottlieb Leopold Fuckel